Central Asians in the United States are Americans with ancestry from Central Asia. They include Kazakh, Kyrgyz, Tajik, Turkmen, and Uzbek individuals. People of Afghan, Baloch, and Uyghur descent are also sometimes classified as Central Asians. The United States census does not mention Central Asians under any category.

Kazakh Americans

Kyrgyz Americans

The Kyrgyz population in the United States are one of the newer and smaller immigrant groups from Central Asia living in the United States. Kyrgyz Americans began to arrive in the United States after 1991, with the opening of the green card lottery.

Tajik Americans

Turkmen Americans

Uzbek Americans

Excluding Afghan Americans, Uzbek Americans are the largest Central Asian population in the United States. 62,713 Uzbeks live in the US, with the largest community existing in the New York City metropolitan area. The New York area Uzbek community is diverse and has 3 main sub-communities: Uzbek Muslims who first came to the United States in the 1980s as political refugees from the Soviet Union living in Morris County, New Jersey, many of whom are staunchly anti-communist and upwardly mobile; newer Uzbek Muslim immigrants to New York City who have benefitted from the green card lottery, 20,000 of whom have settled in Brooklyn since the 2000s; and the Bukharan Jews who mostly live in Queens, many of whom have done well in real estate and the Diamond District.

Bukharan Jews

The United States has the largest community of Bukharan Jews in the world outside of Israel. 70,000 Bukharian Jews reside in the United States, with 50,000 living in the New York City borough of Queens alone. The Bukharan Jews are concentrated in the neighborhoods of Rego Park, Queens and Forest Hills.

Afghan Americans

Afghan Americans ( Amrikāyi-hāye Afghān tabar,  Da Amrīka Afghanan) are Americans of Afghan descent or Americans who originated from Afghanistan. They form the largest Afghan community in North America with the second being Afghan Canadians. The Afghan Americans may originate from any of the ethnic groups of Afghanistan. They have long been considered by the Board of Immigration Appeals and the United States Census Bureau white Americans, but a significant number may also identify themselves as Asian Americans as Afghanistan is considered to be the crossroads of South and Central Asia.

The Afghan community in the United States was minimal until large numbers were admitted as refugees following the December 1979 Soviet invasion of Afghanistan. Others have arrived similarly during and after the latest war in Afghanistan. Afghan Americans reside and work all across the United States. The states of California, Virginia and New York historically had the largest number of Afghan Americans. Thousands may also be found in the states of Arizona, Texas, Georgia, Washington, Oklahoma, Michigan, Idaho, Missouri, North Carolina, and Illinois. As of 2019, their total number is approximately 156,434.

Baloch Americans

Baloch Americans are Americans of Baloch descent.

A 2015 eight-part documentary by VSH News, the first Balochi language news channel, called Balochs in America, shows that Baloch Americans live in different parts of the United States, including Washington D.C., New York, Texas, North Carolina and Washington.[3] Many Baloch Americans come from Pakistan, both from Balochistan province and Karachi city and elsewhere in Pakistan. Others come from the Iranian province of Sistan and Baluchistan. Many Baloch Americans work at nonprofits, information technology companies and in the public sector.

Uyghur Americans

Uyghur Americans are Americans of Uyghur ethnicity. Most Uyghurs immigrated from Xinjiang, China, to the United States from the late 1980s onwards, with a significant number arriving after July 2009.
The Uyghur American population is small, but growing. Northern Virginia has one of the largest Uyghur populations in the United States. Around 1,500 Uyghurs live in the Washington metropolitan area, with the majority living in Fairfax County, Virginia. A small but notable community of around 150 Uyghurs live in the Boston area.

Uyghurs' history in the United States dates back to the 1960s with the arrival of a small number of immigrants. In the late 20th century, after a series of Xinjiang conflicts, thousands of Uyghurs fled from their homeland of Xinjiang ( China ) to Kazakhstan, Turkey, Europe, Canada, Australia, New Zealand, and other countries and places. A 2010 estimate put the Uyghur population in the United States at one thousand, however, the Uyghur American Association has said that more have moved to the United States in the 2010s because of the crackdown in China in July 2009. Several thousand Uyghurs are said to be living in the Washington, D.C. area, which has the largest population of Uyghurs in the United States. There are also small populations of Uyghurs in Los Angeles, New York, San Francisco and Houston.

As for 2019, the Chinese government was reported to routinely carry out harassment and abuse of Uyghurs in the United States in an attempt to control the speech and actions of the estimated 8,905-15,000 persons of Uyghur ethnicity living in the United States. Section 8 of the Uyghur Human Rights Policy Act of 2020 requires a report on "efforts to protect United States citizens and residents, including ethnic Uyghurs and Chinese nationals legally studying or working temporarily in the United States, who have experienced harassment or intimidation within the United States by officials or agents of the Government of the People's Republic of China" to be produced within 90 days.

References

External links

Fix the Census’ Archaic Racial Categories, The New York Times